Shah Neshin (also Romanized as Shāh Neshīn) is a village in Jastun Shah Rural District, Hati District, Lali County, Khuzestan Province, Iran. At the 2006 census, its population was 30, in 4 families.

References 

Populated places in Lali County